Alfred James Pitman (10 December 1881 – 19 April 1964) was an Australian rules footballer who played for the South Melbourne Football Club in the Victorian Football League (VFL).

Family
The son of Frederick John Pitman (1832-1906), a Congregational minister, and Maria Elizabeth Pitman (1838-1889), née Brice, Alfred James Pitman was born Yarrawonga on 10 December 1881.

Football
Recruited from Hawthorn Juniors in 1905, Pitman played seven VFL matches for South Melbourne.

He also played for South Melbourne's First XVIII in three additional matches in 1905:
 21 June 1905: against a combined Albury district team, in Albury.
 24 June 1905: an exhibition match against VFL team Fitzroy, in Sydney.
 28 June 1905: against a NSW representative side, in Sydney.

Death
He died on 19 April 1964.

Notes

External links 

1881 births
1964 deaths
Australian rules footballers from Victoria (Australia)
Sydney Swans players